Tiger poaching in India has seriously impacted the probability of survival of tigers in India. About 3,000 wild tigers now survive compared with 100,000 at the turn of the 20th century. This abrupt decimation in population count was largely due to the slaughter of tigers by colonial and Indian elite, during the British Raj period, and indeed following India's independence. Most of those remaining, about 1,700, are India's Bengal tigers.
Project Tiger in India had been hailed as a great success until it was discovered that the initial count of tigers had been seriously flawed.

Most of the tiger parts end up in China. where a single skin can sell for Rs. 6.5 million.

For poachers there has been about a four percent conviction rate.

Sansar Chand, the notorious Tiger poacher acknowledged to selling 470 tiger skins and 2,130 leopard skins to just four clients from Nepal and Tibet.

Sansar Chand

Sansar Chand,  from the Thanagazi area of Alwar district,  had been termed "the kingpin running the country’s biggest wildlife trade syndicate". He stayed in the trade without getting arrested for 40 years. He ran his business from Delhi's Sadar Bazar. He was called "Veerappan of the North".

He is blamed for wiping out the entire tiger population of Sariska Tiger Reserve in 2005 

In 1991, a group arrested in Sawai Madhopur in Rajasthan confessed that they had poached 15 to 18 tigers in just two years for him. 
In January 2005, a raid at Chand's godown in Patel Nagar led to finding of two tiger skins, 28 leopard skins, 14 tiger canines, three kg of tiger claws, 10 tiger jaws and 60 kg of leopard and tiger paws. In 1988, police had seized 25,800 snake skins from him.
 Sansar Chand's wife Rani and son Akash have also been arrested for wild life trafficking. Sansarchand is an intelligent and sharp animal killer. He was arrested in Patel Nagar area New Delhi.
Police was trying to catch him but they were unsuccessful.after some time Delhi police get a new stage in this case they were found a lead that was sansar chand daily read a newspaper called “Rajasthan Patrika.There after police search all newspaper vendors.
They found a mysterious point told by a vendor.
One bagger was bought 5 different newspapers and he was gave a small notebook paper there all newspapers name written.
After this point police was noticed to that bagger and after 2 days Delhi police was successful for arrested Sansarchand.

See also
 Tiger#Commercial hunting and traditional medicine
 Gir Forest National Park
 Poaching in India

References

Wildlife conservation in India
Tiger reserves of India
Environmental issues in India
Poaching
Hunting by game
Smuggling in India
Hunting in India